Vidar Helgesen (born 21 November 1968) is a Norwegian diplomat and politician for the Conservative Party. He served as Minister of European Affairs and Chief of Staff to Prime Minister Erna Solberg from 2013 to 2015, and Minister of Climate and the Environment from 2015 to 2018.

Career
He served as Secretary-General of the International Institute for Democracy and Electoral Assistance from 2005 to 2013. He was also a State Secretary at the Ministry of Foreign Affairs from 2001 to 2005.

Ministerial appointments
Helgesen was first appointed minister for European affairs, a post he concurrently held while being chief of staff to the prime minister; from 2013 to 2015. On 16 December 2015, he was appointed minister of climate and the environment, a position he held until early 2018, when he was succeeded by Ola Elvestuen once the Liberal Party had entered government.

Minister of European Affairs
He became the first minister of European affairs on 16 October 2013, a newly created ministerial post in Solberg's Cabinet following the Conservative victory in the 2013 election. 

A month into his tenure, he presented the government's strategy to keep Norway visible in the European Union. Helgesen also pledged that they would fight for Norwegian interests within the EU.

In October 2014, Helgesen expressed support for the EU's goal for new energy efficiency, but noted that it would succeed more if it also was free of charge. This came in response to criticism from the Liberal Party, who criticised the government for not taking enough action against reducing emissions of greenhouse gases.

In December, he praised the decision to digitalise the Three Wishes for Cinderella film from 1973, noting that digitalising old films was important. He stated: "Digitalising this film makes it available on new media platforms. The alternative would have been that it would eventually be forgotten".

In late April 2015, Helgesen expressed concerns about Hungarian prime minister Viktor Orbán's comments that the death penalty should be a relevant debate. Helgesen stated: "Hungary is a democracy, but it is sometimes difficult to see the democratic mindset of Orbán in his statements". He also expressed that any EU member state that goes against the union's values should expect counter reactions.

References 

1968 births
Living people
University of Oslo alumni
Norwegian diplomats
Conservative Party (Norway) politicians
Government ministers of Norway
Norwegian state secretaries
Ministers of Climate and the Environment of Norway
Politicians from Bodø